The Second Federal Electoral District of the Federal District (II Distrito Electoral Federal del Distrito Federal) is one of the 300 Electoral Districts into which Mexico is divided for the purpose of elections to the federal Chamber of Deputies and one of 27 such districts in the Federal District ("DF" or Mexico City).

It elects one deputy to the lower house of Congress for each three-year legislative period, by means of the first past the post system.

District territory
Under the 2005 districting scheme, the DF's Second District covers central and western portions of the borough (delegación) of Gustavo A. Madero.

Previous districting schemes

1996–2005 district
Between 1996 and 2005, the Second District covered the same area as at present, but was slightly smaller.

Deputies returned to Congress from this district

XLII Legislature
 1952–1955: Juan José Osorio Palacios (PRI)
XLIII Legislature
 1952–1955:
XLIV Legislature
 1958–1961:
XLV Legislature
 1961–1964:
XLVI Legislature
 1964–1967:
XLVII Legislature
 1967–1970:
XLVIII Legislature
 1970–1973:
XLIX Legislature
 1973–1976:
LI Legislature
 1976–1979: José Salvador Lima Zuno (PRI)
LI Legislature
 1979–1982: Ángel Olivo Solís (PRI)
LII Legislature
 1982–1985: Rodolfo García Pérez (PRI)
LIII Legislature
 1985–1988: Elba Esther Gordillo (PRI)
LIV Legislature
 1988–1991: Onofre Hernández Rivera (PRI)
LV Legislature
 1991–1994:
LVI Legislature
 1994–1997: José Luis Martínez Álvarez (PRI)
LVII Legislature
 1997–2000: Martha Irene Luna Calvo (PRD)
LVIII Legislature
 2000–2003: Luis Fernando Sánchez Nava (PAN)
LIX Legislature
 2003–2006: Miguel Ángel García Domínguez (PRD)
LX Legislature
 2006–2009: Javier González Garza (PRD)

References 

Federal electoral districts of Mexico
Mexico City